Pfaffenhofen an der Roth is a municipality in the district of Neu-Ulm in Bavaria in Germany. Its most famous son is Hermann Köhl, an aviation pioneer of the 1920s.

Geography

Pfaffenhofen lies along the river Roth. The village of Pfaffenhofen proper lies on the west bank of the river, and is surrounded to the North, East and South by farms and wooded areas. Other villages within Pfaffenhofen and der Roth are dispersed throughout the municipality, with farms and wooded areas in between.

Neighbouring municipalities

 Neu-Ulm and Holzheim to the west
 Nersingen to the north
 Bibertal to the east
 Weißenhorn to the south

Municipality parts

The following localities lie within Pfaffenhofen: Diepertshofen, Erbishofen, Volkertshofen, Beuren, Balmertshofen, Biberberg, Niederhausen, Roth, Berg, Remmeltshofen, Kadeltshofen, Raunertshofen, Hirbishofen and Luippen.

Historical Overview

12th Century - There is mention of Pfaffenhoffen's castle, on the right bank of the Roth river.

1303 - First documented mention of Pfaffenhoffen, when Count Ulrich von Berg Schelklingen sold his county and the Pfaffenhofen castle to Duke Frederick IV of Austria, for 700 silver marks.

1375 - The Church of St. Martin is founded.

1470 - The first schoolmaster arrives in Pfaffenhofen.

1618 - Beginning of the Thirty Years War, which devastated the area. The region was also beset by plague, which killed 2,000 of the original 2,300 inhabitants.

1700 - Census indicates that Pfaffenhofen has 30 residences and 190 inhabitants.

1720 - The first craft guild was formed by the house of Fugger. The guild met in the "Innere Taverne."

1725 - The Elizabeth Chapel was built as an addition to the Church of St. Martin. The church underwent modifications in the Baroque style.

1784 - House numbers were introduced for tax purposes.

1802 - An unidentified epidemic sweeps the area.

1805 - Napoleon stayed overnight at the 'Äußere Taverne.' From this place he issued a proclamation to his soldiers at the Battle of Ulm.

1806 - the Kingdom of Bavaria was formed by King Maximilian I, and incorporated Pfaffenhofen.

1835 - The census indicates that Pfaffenhofen had 53 residences with 270 inhabitants.

1838 - King Ludwig I. of Bavaria lent Pfaffenhofen the coat of arms: a silver tin tower at a green hill under blue sky.

1856 - New building of a two story schoolhouse on Hauptstraße. In 1908 it was expanded.

1899 - The town was connected to the electricity grid.

1900 - In 85 houses lived 320 inhabitants. The first medical practice with Dr. Sontheimer was opened.

1914 - World War I: The war, which took four years, demanded 110 soldiers. A bus line was introduced, which took over the suburban traffic from Weißenhorn to Neu-Ulm.

1919 - A police station with five officers was introduced, which was closed again in 1959.

1925 - A convent was built.

1928 - Hermann Köhl, Ehrenfried Günther Freiherr von Hünefeld and James  Fitzmaurice crossed the Atlantic Sea from east to west with a plane.

1933 - 40 subscribers were connected to the telephone exchange of Pfaffenhofen.

1939 - The number of inhabitants rose to 420. World War II began and took six years, claiming the lives of 290 inhabitants. Eight buildings were destroyed by fire in 1944.

1946 - By accepting refugees, the number of inhabitants rose to 900.

1949 - Post-war redevelopment began with the "Millersiedlung" apartments, the first of their kind in Swabia.

1954 - The 'Martinssiedlung' followed, and after this the 'St.-Ulrich-Siedlung'. The building areas 'Rehgräble' and 'Osterholz' were also connected.

1959 - The number of inhabitants rose to 1250, among them 610 refugees. The St. Martins church was converted and increased to double in capacity. On the south exit of Pfaffenhofen was built an eight-class school with the name 'Hermann-Köhl-Schule'.

1960 - Building of the Protestant church 'Zum guten Hirten' at the Sonnhalde.

1974 - The 500-year anniversary of Pfaffenhofen was celebrated.

1978 - Pfaffenhofen and the neighbour Holzheim developed a central administrative body.

1987 - A new city hall at the Kirchplatz was built, including the Hermann-Köhl-Museum.

2000 - The number of inhabitants exceeds about 7000.

2003 - Pfaffenhofen celebrated the 700th anniversary of the first documentary mention back in 1303.

Local council

The local council consists of Josef Walz (1st mayor) (since 1990), Erwin Stötter (2nd mayor) and Karlheinz Thoma (SPD) (3rd mayor) as well as 18 further members.

Points of Interest

One of Pfaffenhoffen's many points of interest is the parish church of Saint Martin, which was built in Romanesque style in 1375, and transformed into late gothic style in 1450. In 1761, its characteristic lantern dome was added.  The church underwent a full restoration in 1958.

Since 1470 there has been a school master in Pfaffenhofen, while school houses are known since the beginning of the 19th century, and have been expanded and augmented with newly built schools as the population has risen. In 1959, a new school was built, and named the "Hermann-Köhl-Schule". Rising numbers of students and the lack of special rooms made an extension necessary, which was finished in 1997. Thus the "Hermann-Köhl-Schule" of Pfaffenhofen is the largest elementary- and main-school in the district of Neu-Ulm.

Sport
Football: SV Pfaffenhofen became local league champion in the season 2004/2005.

Regular events
Marktfest (Beginning of July)

Economics and infrastructure

Traffic
Pfaffenhofen has a connection to the Donau-Iller-Nahverkehrsverbund.
Bus lines:
Weißenhorn - Pfaffenhofen - Holzheim - Neu-Ulm - Ulm
Roggenburg - Niederhausen - Beuren - Pfaffenhofen - Nersingen - Glockerau
Weißenhorn - Pfaffenhofen - Günzburg

Pfaffenhofen lies at the junction of the Günzburg - Babenhausen and Senden - Ichenhausen roads.

Companies
Egle Lebensmittel (Food)
Lidl central depot for south-east Germany
NewTec GmbH (Safety related Hard- and Software)

References

External links
 Official homepage

Neu-Ulm (district)